Khvordeh Luki (also Romanized as Khvordeh Lūkī; also known as Khowrdeh Lūkī) is a village in Zu ol Faqr Rural District, Sarshiv District, Saqqez County, Kurdistan Province, Iran. At the 2006 census, its population was 541, in 105 families. The village is populated by Kurds.

References 

Towns and villages in Saqqez County
Kurdish settlements in Kurdistan Province